Rame Head or Ram Head is a coastal headland, southwest of the village of Rame in southeast Cornwall, United Kingdom. It is part of the larger Rame Peninsula.

History and antiquities

The natural site was used for a promontory fort ('cliff castle') in the Iron Age and the narrow neck of land was further excavated on the landward side with a central causeway, still visible. The eastern part retains traces of round house platforms, though damaged by wartime construction. The headland has a prominent chapel, dedicated to St Michael, as are many early Christian headland sites in the region, accessible by a steep footpath.

The chapel was first licensed for Mass in 1397 and is on the site of a much earlier and ancient, Celtic, hermitage. It remains as an intact shell and was originally lime-washed so that it stood out on the headland. Ordwulf, who was the owner of vast estates in the West Country and was the uncle of King Ethelred the Unready, gave Rame to Tavistock Abbey (which Ordwulf had founded) in 981, meaning the parish was technically in Devon until the modern period.

Rame Head in modern times

Around the head, Dartmoor ponies are kept to graze. This area is also frequented by deer, sheep and cattle which can often be viewed from the sea. Due to its exceptionally high and panoramic vantage point, there is a volunteer National Coastwatch Institution lookout on the top of the headland (next to the car park). Rame Head is a part of Mount Edgcumbe House and Country Park which is jointly owned and run by Cornwall Council and Plymouth City Council.

The headland is prominent to sailors and fishermen leaving Plymouth through Plymouth Sound. It is often the last piece of land they see leaving England, and the first they see when returning home; Rame Head thus appears in the sea shanty "Spanish Ladies".

The headland forms part of Rame Head & Whitsand Bay SSSI (Site of Special Scientific Interest), noted for its geological as well as biological interest. The SSSI contains 2 species on the Red Data Book of rare and endangered plant species; early meadow-grass (poa infirma) and slender bird’s-foot-trefoil (from the lotus genus).

See also

 Maker, Cornwall

References

External links
 Village Holiday Information
 National Coastwatch Institution - Rame Head
 Rame Head Wildlife
   Old Photographs of Rame Headland
 The head on a 1946 map
 Protest Site for Rame Wind Turbines

Headlands of Cornwall
Hill forts in Cornwall
Iron Age sites in Cornwall
Military history of Cornwall
Sites of Special Scientific Interest in Cornwall
Sites of Special Scientific Interest notified in 1996